Barrack Point is a seaside suburb of the City of Shellharbour, New South Wales, Australia which sits within the southern Wollongong urban area. Surrounding suburbs are Warilla to the north, Barrack Heights to the west, and Shellharbour to the south. 

The Surfrider Caravan Park is found here opposite Shellharbour Beach.

References

Suburbs of Wollongong
City of Shellharbour